Smolyanoye is a rural locality (a selo) in Chergalinsky Selsoviet of Romnensky District, Amur Oblast, Russia. The population was 124 as of 2018. There are 4 streets.

Geography 
Smolyanoye is located on the right bank of the Gorbyl River, 27 km northeast of Romny (the district's administrative centre) by road. Pridorozhnoye is the nearest rural locality.

References 

Rural localities in Romnensky District